Fustin, sometimes called "dihydrofisetin", is a flavanonol, a type of flavonoid. It can be found in young fustic (Cotinus coggygria) and in the lacquer tree (Toxicodendron vernicifluum).

Fustin shows protective effects on 6-hydroxydopamine-induced neuronal cell death.

Unlike fisetin, fustin has no double bond in the C-ring. This makes fustin a flavan, with two stereocenters and four stereoisomers.

References

Flavanonols
Catechols